Louse Creek is a stream in southern Oregon County in the Ozarks of southern Missouri. It is a tributary of Frederick Creek.

The stream source area lies north of Missouri Route 142 and it flows northeast crossing under Missouri Route E and joins Frederick Creek east of Garfield.

Louse Creek was so named on account of the poor hygiene of the locals near its course.

See also
List of rivers of Missouri

References

Rivers of Oregon County, Missouri
Rivers of Missouri